The 1972–73 South Carolina Gamecocks men's basketball team represented the University of South Carolina during the 1972–73 men's college basketball season.

Schedule

References 

South Carolina Gamecocks men's basketball seasons
South Carol
South Carol
South Car
South Car